Antonio Coleman (born September 1, 1986) is a former American football Defensive end. He used to be with the Sacramento Mountain Lions of the United Football League. He used to be a member of the Optimist branch of the Boys & Girls Clubs of South Alabama.  He attended Auburn University. Coleman was named to the Associated Press All-Southeastern Conference football first-team in 2008 and was considered one of the top outside linebacker prospects for the 2010 NFL Draft. He has been a member of the New York Giants.

College career
Coleman led Auburn with six sacks and 10.5 tackles for loss in 2008. He finished the season with 46 tackles (29 solo, 17 assists) and had a team-high 13 quarterback hurries, as well as a forced fumble and a pass break-up. He was named the SEC's Defensive Lineman of the Week following Auburn's 14-12 victory over Tennessee September 27 after completing four tackles including a sack and 1.6 tackles for loss.

Coleman was named to the ESPN.com 2009 preseason All-SEC first-team. Despite having a cast on his right hand the first 7 weeks of the season, Coleman still finished as the best pass rusher in the SEC, finishing the 2009 season ranked 1st in sacks and 2nd in tackles for loss.

Professional career

Buffalo Bills
Coleman was signed as an undrafted rookie free agent by the Buffalo Bills on April 25, 2010. He was waived by the team on September 3, 2011.

New York Giants
On September 28, Coleman was signed to the New York Giants' practice squad.

Return to Buffalo
The Buffalo Bills signed Coleman off of the Giants' practice squad on October 25 after a season-ending injury to Shawne Merriman. He was released on December 17, 2011.

Saskatchewan Roughriders
On April 29, 2013, he signed with the Saskatchewan Roughriders of the Canadian Football League (CFL).

Hamilton Tiger-Cats
He signed with the Hamilton Tiger-Cats of the CFL on May 31, 2014.

References

External links
Hamilton Tiger-Cats bio
Auburn Tigers bio
Sacramento Mountain Lions bio

1986 births
Living people
Sportspeople from Mobile, Alabama
Players of American football from Alabama
American football linebackers
American football defensive ends
Auburn Tigers football players
Buffalo Bills players
New York Giants players
Sacramento Mountain Lions players
Saskatchewan Roughriders players
Hamilton Tiger-Cats players